Alfred Pereira (August 8, 1906 to January 15, 1990) was an American professional wrestler, known as Al "Power House" Pereira. He held the European Heavyweight Championship twice.

Early life 
Pereira was born in Half Moon Bay, California, the son of Portuguese immigrants.

Professional wrestling career 
Pereira won the European Heavyweight Championship in July 1937 in Paris, France, defeating Henri Deglane. He later lost the title to Dan Koloff, later reclaimed it and then lost it again to Koloff.

Personal life and death 
Pereira later opened "Al Pereira's Inn" in Honolulu, Hawaii. In 1933–36, Pereira was living at 144 N27th St, San Jose, California. In 1935 or 1936, Pereira married Nellie (born 1902/03), and they had a son, Alfred D Pereira Jr. In 1937 Alf and Nellie Pereira were living in Oakland, California. In later life, Pereira lived in Reno, Nevada. On January 15, 1990, Pereira died in Multnomah, Portland, Oregon.

Championships and accomplishments 
European Heavyweight Championship (2 times)
World Heavyweight Championship (European version) (1 time)

References

External links 
 

1906 births
1990 deaths
American male professional wrestlers
American male sport wrestlers
American people of Portuguese descent
People from Half Moon Bay, California
Professional wrestlers from California
Sportspeople from the San Francisco Bay Area